Copelatus romani is a species of diving beetle. It is part of the genus Copelatus in the subfamily Copelatinae of the family Dytiscidae. It was described by Zimmermann in 1924.

References

romani
Beetles described in 1924